Oliver Wolcott Technical High School, Wolcott Tech, or OWTS is a technical high school located in Torrington, Connecticut. It is in the Connecticut Technical High School System. Wolcott Tech receives students from many nearby towns. In 2015, the school received a 153 million dollar grant for a new building to replace the original built more than 60 years ago.

References

External links
 

Public high schools in Connecticut